Minto Aerodrome  is a registered aerodrome in Yukon, Canada. It is a  gravel strip orientated 17/35. It was built by Minto Explorations Ltd. to service their Minto Mine copper and gold mining operation.

References 

Registered aerodromes in Yukon